The Contempt of Court Act 1981 is an Act of the Parliament of the United Kingdom. It codifies some aspects of the common law offence of contempt of court.

Section 8 of the Act provides that it is an offence for a person to ask for or make public any opinions or arguments put forward by a jury member in the course of making a decision.

References

United Kingdom Acts of Parliament 1981